A Successful Man is a 1986 Cuban drama film directed by Humberto Solás. It was screened in the Un Certain Regard section at the 1987 Cannes Film Festival and it was entered into the 15th Moscow International Film Festival. It won Best Production Design and Grand Coral - First Prize in the 1986 Havana Film Festival. The film was selected as the Cuban entry for the Best Foreign Language Film at the 60th Academy Awards, but was not accepted as a nominee.

Cast

 César Évora - Javier Argüelles
 Raquel Revuelta - Raquel
 Daisy Granados - Rita
 Jorge Trinchet - Darío Argüelles
 Rubens de Falco - Iriarte
 Mabel Roch - Ileana Ponce
 Carlos Cruz - Puig
 Miguel Navarro - Lucilo
 Omar Valdés - Facundo Lara
 Ángel Espasande - Father Rubén
 Ángel Toraño - Ponce
 Isabel Moreno - Berta
 Nieves Riovalles - Darío's wife
 Jorge Alí - Baseball player
 Denise Patarra - Puig's girlfriend
 Max Álvarez - Priest
 Niola Montes - Mrs. Ponce
 Orlando Contreras - Darío's friend

See also
 List of Cuban films
 List of submissions to the 60th Academy Awards for Best Foreign Language Film
 List of Cuban submissions for the Academy Award for Best Foreign Language Film

References

External links

1986 films
1980s Spanish-language films
1986 drama films
Cuban drama films
Films directed by Humberto Solás